Joseph Rajappa (3 November 1918 - 27 December 1989) was a Priest of the Roman Catholic Church in India.  He was the first Bishop in Roman Catholic Diocese of Kurnool (1967-1988) and in Roman Catholic Diocese of Khammam (1988-1989).  He hailed from Anekal in erstwhile Mysore state.  

He underwent spiritual formation St. Peter's Pontifical Seminary, Bangalore.

References

Further reading
 

Kannada people
People from Kurnool district
People from Khammam district
1918 births
1989 deaths

20th-century Roman Catholic archbishops in India
People from Karnataka
Indian Roman Catholic archbishops